Cachisca Lake is a body of water in the Broadback River watershed in the Eeyou Istchee James Bay (municipality) area of the Nord-du-Québec, in the province of Quebec, in Canada. This lake is part of the territory of Assinica Wildlife Sanctuary and Turgis Township.

Forestry is the main economic activity of the sector. Recreational tourism activities come second.

The surface of Cachisca Lake is usually frozen from early November to mid-May, however, safe ice movement is generally from mid-November to mid-April.

Geography 
The shape of the lake is narrower towards the North and more flared towards the South where there are several islands and peninsulas.

Lake Cachisca is embedded between Opataca Lake (east) and Assinica Lake (west). Lake Cachisca is located to the south of mountains whose several peaks reach more than : eleven summits to the North et six summits to the West.

The mouth of Lake Cachisca is located at:
 east of the mouth of Comencho Lake;
 south-east of the mouth of Assinica Lake;
 southeast of the mouth of the Assinica River (confluence with the Broadback River;
 east of the mouth of Evans Lake;
 east of the mouth of the Broadback River (confluence with Rupert Bay);
 north-west of downtown Chibougamau;
 northwest of the village center of Chapais, Quebec

The main hydrographic slopes near Cachisca Lake are:
North side: Frotet Lake, Regnault Lake, Chatillon River, Broadback River, Troilus Lake;
East side: Opataca Lake, Brock River West, Brock River North, Chibougamau River, Mistassini Lake;
South side: Comencho Lake, Waposite Lake, Chibougamau River, Brock River (Chibougamau River);
West side: Naomi Creek, Omo River, Omo Lake, Maicasagi River.

Toponymy
Formerly, this body of water was designated "Lake Capacwachipsca". In 1939, the Quebec Geography Commission formalized this hydronym. Of Cree origin, this hydronym translates an abbreviated form of "Capacwachipsca", which could mean "lake rock in shallow water."

The toponym "Lac Cachisca" was formalized on December 5, 1968, by the Commission de toponymie du Québec, when it was created.

Notes and references

See also 

Eeyou Istchee James Bay
Lakes of Nord-du-Québec
LCachisca